Robert Ernest Sharpe (December 9, 1918 – December 4, 1997), nicknamed "Pepper", was an American Negro league pitcher for the Memphis Red Sox and Chicago American Giants in the 1940s.

A native of Rena Lara, Mississippi, Sharpe was the oldest of 12 children. His career highlights included a no-hitter against the Kansas City Monarchs. Sharpe served in the US Army in 1945 and 1946, and was honored by the city of San Diego, California in 1994, as July 24 was proclaimed "Robert 'Pepper' Sharpe Day". He died in San Diego in 1997 at age 78.

References

External links
 and Seamheads

1918 births
1997 deaths
Chicago American Giants players
Memphis Red Sox players
Baseball players from Mississippi
People from Coahoma County, Mississippi
Baseball pitchers
20th-century African-American sportspeople